Calvin N'Sombo (born 24 June 1997) is a Finnish footballer who plays as a midfielder for PEPO.

Club career

N'Sombo started his career with HJK, Finland's most successful club, where he made 2 appearances and scored 0 goals. On 17 February 2015, N'Sombo debuted for HJK during a 2-2 draw with RoPS.

In 2015, he signed for Klubi-04 in the Finnish third division.

In 2016, N'Sombo was sent on loan to Finnish top flight side PK-35 Vantaa, where he made 2 league appearances and scored 0 goals. On 12 September 2016, he debuted for PK-35 Vantaa during a 1-3 loss to Ilves.

In 2018, N'Sombo signed for Hercules in the Finnish third division.

International career

He is eligible to represent North Macedonia internationally through his mother.

References

External links

 
 Calvin N'Sombo at playmakerstats.com

Living people
1997 births
Finnish footballers
Association football midfielders
Veikkausliiga players
Kakkonen players
Ykkönen players
Helsingin Jalkapalloklubi players
FC Honka players
PK-35 Vantaa (men) players
Klubi 04 players
Finland youth international footballers
Finnish people of Macedonian descent
PEPO Lappeenranta players
JS Hercules players